Malta Bend is the fourth album by American rapper Stevie Stone, the third on Tech N9ne's label Strange Music. It was released on June 30, 2015.

Background
The album was available for pre-order on May 19. The bonus track is "Eat".

Singles
"Run It" is the first single. The video was released on May 27.
"Fall In Love With It" is the second single. The audio was released on June 3 and the video on July 27.
"Rain Dance" is the third single. The audio was released on June 15 and the video on July 9.
"Get Fucked Up" is the fourth single. The video was released on June 29.

Commercial performance
The album debuted at number 193 on the Billboard 200 chart.

Track listing

References

2015 albums
Albums produced by J. White Did It
Stevie Stone albums
Strange Music albums